The Colour of My Love Concert is the second home video by Canadian singer Celine Dion, released on VHS on 19 October 1995 and on DVD on 6 January 1998. It was filmed in September 1993 at Le Théàtre Capitole in Quebec City, Canada and aired in December 1993 in Canada on CTV and in February 1994 in the United States on Disney Channel.

Background
Dion performed songs from her first three English-language albums, in particular the multi-platinum The Colour of My Love. Throughout a concert-length program featuring guests like Peabo Bryson and Clive Griffin, she sang her chart-topping hits: "The Power of Love" and "Think Twice". Dion also performed Elvis Presley's hit song, "Can't Help Falling in Love".

The music video of Dion's "Pour que tu m'aimes encore" was included as a special VHS bonus in Europe.

The Colour of My Love Concert spent 39 weeks on the Top Music Video chart in the United States, peaking at number 19. It was certified Platinum for selling 100,000 copies. It was also certified Platinum in the United Kingdom (50,000) and France (20,000). In the UK and Australia, The Colour of My Love Concert peaked at number 3.

Thanks to The Colour of My Love Concert, Dion was nominated for the Gemini Award for Best Performance in a Variety Program or Series and the concert was nominated for two other Geminis: for Best Music, Variety Program or Series and Best Photography in a Comedy, Variety, Performing Arts Program or Series.

Track listing

Charts

Weekly charts

Year-end charts

Certifications

Release history

References

1995 video albums
Celine Dion video albums
Live video albums